MIDItar Hero is a software that makes use of a Guitar Hero or Rock Band instrument as a MIDI controller created by Brian Westbrook built in Max/MSP. It allows guitar controllers and drum controllers to be used as a MIDI controller for synthesizers. MIDItar Hero is compatible with Windows XP/Vista and Mac OS X. Its first and only release was published on April 7, 2009, as MIDItar Hero 1.0.

Controller Compatibility
MIDItar Hero supports most Rock Band and Guitar Hero controllers for the Xbox 360, PS3, Wii, and PS2. If a guitar/drum controller is not compatible, users can make a preset for the controller within the program.

Modes
MIDItar Hero includes four different modes that can be used to achieve different results: easy, normal, drum, and sample.

Easy mode
In easy mode, the player plays chord progressions 1-8 with the three buttons (green, red, and yellow). Holding down the blue button allows the player to play power chords, while holding down the orange button can change the key to major, minor, or diminished, depending on what scale they have chosen. The choices for scales are major, harmonic minor, natural minor, blues, and thrash.

Normal mode
In normal mode, the player can play 32 notes using the 5 fret buttons. The default notes are E1 to B3, but this can be changed by the player. Normal mode uses a binary pattern.

Drum mode
In drum mode, the player can assign each drum pad to a sound.

Sample mode
In sample mode, the player can make each button play a pre-designated sound sample.

References

External links
 

Game controllers
Software